Jean-Louis Bernard Barrault (8 September 1910 – 22 January 1994) was a French actor, director and mime artist who worked on both screen and stage.

Biography 
Barrault was born in Le Vésinet in France in 1910. His father was 'a Burgundian pharmacist who died in the First World War.':87 He studied at the Collége Chaptal until 1930, when he began his studies at the École du Louvre.:87

Theatre 
From 1931 to 1935 Barrault studied and acted at Charles Dullin's L'Atelier.:32 His first performance was a small role in Ben Jonson's Volpone. At the time, Barrault was unable to afford rent and Dullin allowed him to sleep in the theatre on Volpone's bed.:16 It was L'Atelier that he first met and studied under Étienne Decroux,:41 with whom he would create the pantomime La Vie Primitive in 1931.:87

He was a member of the Comédie-Française from 1942 to 1946, performing lead roles in Shakespeare's Hamlet and Corneille's Le Cid.:32 He and his wife, actress Madeleine Renaud, formed their own troupe, Compagnie Renaud-Barrault, in 1946 at Paris' Théâtre Marigny.:161 In 1951 he published his memoirs, Reflections on the Theatre.

He was made director of Théâtre de France in 1959, and remained in the role until 1969. In 1971 he was reappointed director of Théâtre des Nations. He retired from theatre in 1990.:87

Film 
In 1935 he had his first film role in Marc Allégret's Les Beaux Jours.:87 He would go on to act in nearly 50 movies over the course of his career. One of his most famous performances was in Marcel Carné's film Les Enfants du Paradis (1945), in which he played the mime Jean-Gaspard Deburau.:161

He was the uncle of actress Marie-Christine Barrault and sometime sponsor of Peter Brook. In 1940, he married the actress Madeleine Renaud. They founded a number of theaters together and toured extensively, including in South America.

Barrault died from a heart attack in Paris on January 22, 1994 at the age of 83.:87 He is buried with his wife Renaud in the Passy Cemetery in Paris.

Filmography

References

External links

 
 
Barrault Photo Collection

1910 births
1994 deaths
Burials at Passy Cemetery
French film directors
French mimes
People from Le Vésinet
Sociétaires of the Comédie-Française
French male stage actors
French male film actors
Special Tony Award recipients
20th-century French male actors